Mareke Giri is a type of traditional street performance in Iran. The Mareke Gir is a person who entertains people with his "special powers", such as breaking chains with his arms, breaking stones with his hands, handling big cats, and/or handling snakes. 

Mareke Giri are free shows in public locations; viewers will give the performer some money to encourage them. Occasionally the shows will have a mix religious undertones, and sometimes an element of fraud will occur.

See also 
 List of busking locations
 Persian theatre, history of entertainment in Iran
 Pahlevani and zoorkhaneh rituals, traditional system of athletics for men in Iran

References

External links 
 

Entertainment events in Iran
Street performance
Performing arts in Iran